Gabi Müller (born 21 November 1974) is a Swiss sprint canoer who competed in the mid-1990s. She won a silver medal in the K-4 500 m event at the 1996 Summer Olympics in Atlanta.

References
DatabaseOlympics.com profile

1974 births
Canoeists at the 1996 Summer Olympics
Living people
Olympic canoeists of Switzerland
Olympic silver medalists for Switzerland
Swiss female canoeists
Olympic medalists in canoeing

Medalists at the 1996 Summer Olympics